Yeni Həyat (also, Yeni-Khayat) is a village and municipality in the Khachmaz Rayon of Azerbaijan.  It has a population of 3,503.

References 

Populated places in Khachmaz District